Raúl Orlandini (1952–2006) was a Peruvian race car driver.

He won the  National Road Grand Prix "Caminos del Inca" five times (1992, 1993, 1994, 2003 and 2005), first with a Nissan Silvia and then a Mitsubishi Lancer Evo.

References

Sportspeople from Lima
Peruvian racing drivers
1952 births
2006 deaths